Los Zafiros (The Sapphires) were a Cuban close-harmony vocal group working from 1962 until 1976. The group was part of the filín (feeling) movement, inspired by American doo-wop groups such as The Platters. Their music was a fusion of Cuban genres, such as the bolero, with doo-wop, ballads, R&B, calypso, Bossa Nova and early rock and roll.

History 
Los Zafiros were formed in Cayo Hueso, Havana in 1962, by Miguel Ángel Cancio Soria, with the following members:
Leoncio Morúa (Kike)
Miguel Cancio (Miguelito) (Founder and first Director)
Ignacio Elejalde, a counter-tenor, in high register.
Eduardo Elio  Hernández (El Chino)
Oscar Aguirre (de Fontana) (first guitar and composer).
later, Manuel Galbán (guitar) became musical director, and at times Oscar Aguirre (guitar) substituted.

The group was highly successful from the start, with high record sales and popular tours at home and abroad. However, some members of the group were self-destructive and undisciplined, with heavy drinking and other activities. Two died young: Ignacio died in 1981 at the age of 37 from a brain hemorrhage. Kike died in 1983 from cirrhosis of the liver. El Chino, beset by vision, speech and drinking problems, lived alone in Cayo Hueso until his death on 8 August 1995 at age 56. Today only one  member is alive, Miguel Cancio, who lives in Miami and also Oscar Aguirre the first guitar player.

Manuel Galbán and his wife lived  in the same house in Havana as in the heyday of Los Zafiros, until he died of cardiac arrest on July 7, 2011. He was active on the Cuban music scene through his work in The Buena Vista Social Club and as a recording artist for World Circuit records. In 2001, World Circuit arranged a special recording session for Galbán and Cancio at EGREM. Along with Orlando Lopez (Cachaito), Roberto Garcia and Bernardo Garcia (Chori), Cancio and Galbán recorded two of their old songs. This session plays a central role in the film and marks the first time that Galbán and Cancio recorded together in over thirty years.

In 1987 a revival group known as Los Nuevos Zafiros was formed.

Discography
 Bossa Cubana CD (1963–1967, re-released 1999)
 Los Zafiros Story CD (2006)
 Los Zafiros: Music from the edge of time. DVD

References

External links
 Los Zafiros "Music from the Edge of Time" Documentary Film Website
 Los Zafiros - Discogs

Cuban musical groups
Musical groups established in 1962
1962 establishments in Cuba
Doo-wop groups
World Circuit (record label) artists